Chortiatis is a suburb and a former municipality in the Thessaloniki regional unit, Greece. Since the 2011 Kallikratis local government reform it is part of the municipality Pylaia-Chortiatis, of which it is a municipal unit. It lies at 600 metres altitude on the slopes of the Mount Chortiatis, from which it takes its name. The municipal unit Chortiatis has an area of 109.934 km2, and the community Chortiatis has an area of 57.315 km2.

History of the area
In the antiquity, mountain and town were known as Cissus and Homer tells us that Cisseus was the king of this town. The town and its people are mentioned as members of the Delian League in the 5th century BC.

The modern name and town Chortiatis can be traced back to the 12th century, when a Byzantine monastery under the name Chortaites, on the northern slopes of the mountain, provided Thessaloniki with fresh water by an aqueduct whose remains have been partly preserved. By the 15th century the settlement with the monastery was called Kastron Chortiatis (Castle Chortiatis) and it fell in 1423 under Ottoman rule. In 1912 the Greek town was liberated.

The Massacre of Chortiatis

The Chortiatis massacre was a World War II mass murder of 146 civilians by the Wehrmacht, at the end of the occupation of Greece by the Axis powers on 2 September 1944.

After an attack on two German soldiers, one German chemist and two Greek collaborators by the Greek People's Liberation Army (ELAS) on mount Chortiatis, where the two Collaborators and the Chemist were killed, the German occupation authorities decided to react immediately with a reprisal operation against the civilian population of the village Chortiatis. About twenty trucks with German soldiers and the paramilitary force Jagdkommando Schubert, named after the Wehrmacht sergeant Friedrich Schubert who was in command, surrounded the village. They gathered all the people they found in the town square. One group of the civilians was led into the house of villager Evangelos Ntinoudis. They were locked inside and burnt alive. The other group was locked in the bakery. Schubert's men set up machine guns to make sure that no one can flee out of the bakery. But one 6-year-old girl managed to flee with help of the others outside a window which was unprotected. They others were burnt alive. Apart from the people who were killed in the two groups, others were raped and  killed outside their homes or even in the village, while trying to escape. A total of 146 civilians residents of Chortiatis were killed that day. 109 of them were women and girls. One week later the Germans came back and set the whole village on fire. 300 homes were burned down.

References

Populated places in Thessaloniki (regional unit)